Kolondieba is a small town and commune in the cercle of Kolondiéba, in the Sikasso Region of southern Mali. At the 2009 Census, the commune had a population of 57,898.

In the local language, Kolondieba means "Big White Well."

See also 
 List of cities in Mali

References 

Communes of Sikasso Region